Marcus Valdez Pereira Godinho (born June 28, 1997) is a Canadian professional soccer player who plays as a right-back for Ekstraklasa side Korona Kielce.

Club career

Toronto FC II
After spending time with the Toronto FC Academy in the Second Division of the Canadian Soccer League, Godinho signed an Academy Player Agreement with USL club Toronto FC II.  He made his professional debut for the club on March 28, 2015 in a 2–0 victory over FC Montreal.

Heart of Midlothian
After playing with Vaughan Azzurri of League1 Ontario to stay match fit, on June 15, 2016, Godinho signed for Hearts and joined up with the club's development squad ahead of the 2016–17 season. In August 2017, Godinho was loaned to Scottish League Two side Berwick Rangers until January 2018. Godinho signed a contract extension with Hearts until 2020 on February 22, 2018. He made his debut for Hearts in the Scottish Cup against Motherwell on March 4, and his league debut the following weekend on March 9 in the Edinburgh derby against Hibernian. He scored his first goal for Hearts against St Johnstone on January 26, 2019.

FSV Zwickau
In July 2019, Godinho joined German 3. Liga side FSV Zwickau on a two-year contract. He made his competitive debut for Zwickau in their season opener against SV Meppen on July 25. In May 2021 upon expiration of his contract, Godinho departed the club.

Vancouver Whitecaps FC
On August 20, 2021, Godinho returned to Canada and joined Major League Soccer club Vancouver Whitecaps FC. He made his first appearance for Vancouver on August 30, coming off the bench in a 4-1 victory over Real Salt Lake. In December 2021 Vancouver announced they had picked up Godinho's contract option, keep him at the club through the 2022 season. At the end of the 2022 season, Vancouver announced they would not exercise the option on Godinho's contract for 2023, ending his time with the club.

Korona Kielce
In January 2023, Godinho returned to Europe and joined Polish club Korona Kielce on a contract until the end of the season.

International career

Youth
Godinho was born in Canada to Portuguese parents. He has represented Canada at the under-18 and under-20 levels. In August 2016, Godinho was called up to the U-20 team for a pair of friendlies against Costa Rica. Godinho was named to the Canadian U-23 provisional roster for the 2020 CONCACAF Men's Olympic Qualifying Championship on February 26, 2020. He was named to the final squad ahead of the re-scheduled tournament on March 10, 2021.

Senior
Godinho received his first call up to the Canadian senior team on March 12, 2018 for a friendly against New Zealand He made his debut in that match, a 1–0 victory for Canada. In May 2019, Godinho was named to the final 23-man squad for the 2019 CONCACAF Gold Cup.

Career statistics

Club

International

References

External links
 
 

1997 births
Living people
Association football defenders
Canadian soccer players
Soccer players from Toronto
Canadian people of Portuguese descent
Toronto FC players
Toronto FC II players
Vaughan Azzurri players
Heart of Midlothian F.C. players
Berwick Rangers F.C. players
FSV Zwickau players
Vancouver Whitecaps FC players
Korona Kielce players
USL League Two players
USL Championship players
League1 Ontario players
Scottish Professional Football League players
3. Liga players
Major League Soccer players
Canada men's youth international soccer players
Canada men's international soccer players
2019 CONCACAF Gold Cup players
Canadian expatriate soccer players
Canadian expatriate sportspeople in the United States
Expatriate soccer players in the United States
Expatriate footballers in Scotland
Canadian expatriate sportspeople in Scotland
Expatriate footballers in Germany
Canadian expatriate sportspeople in Germany
Expatriate footballers in Poland
Canadian expatriate sportspeople in Poland